Thozha is a 2008 Tamil-language film which released on 11 April 2008. Nithin Sathya, Premji, Vijay Vasanth, Ajay Raj and Soumya Bollapragada play the lead roles while Nancy Jennifer, who has appeared in sister roles in Ghilli and Jambhavan is making her debut as a heroine. Those four actors have already worked together in (Chennai 600028).

Plot
The story is about four friends and one of them sacrificing his life for the sake of friendship. Arivazhagan (Premji), Gajani (Vijay Vasanth), and Raja (Nithin Sathya) are close friends. Velu (Ajay Raj), who is out to avenge the killing of his younger sister by her boyfriend, also joins these friends. In this situation, a rowdy's daughter Priya (Nancy Jennifer) loves Velu, but he does not reciprocate. He has to first kill the person who cheated his sister and took her life. When it is known that it is Raja is the culprit, Ajay picks up an 'aruval' and rushes to confront him. In the meantime, Raja hires a mercenary paying him Rs. 5 lakhs to kill Velu. The friends are divided, and the outcome of the clashes between them forms the climax.

Cast

 Nithin Sathya as Raja
 Premji as Arivazhagan
 Vijay Vasanth as Gajani
 Ajay Raj as Velu
 Sagithiya as Meenakshi
 Nancy Jennifer as Priya
 Pavithra as Alamu
 Lakshana
 Soumya Bollapragada as Manisha Gupta
 Vennira Aadai Moorthy
 Delhi Kumar
 Ajay Ratnam
 Sashikumar
 Kavithalaya Krishnan
 Saakshi Siva
 Raviprakash
 Babylona as Saroja
 Suja Varunee (item number)

Soundtrack
Soundtrack was composed by Premji Amaran and lyrics were written by Gangai Amaran, Vaali and Snehan. Soundtrack contains the remixed version of "Oru Nayagan" from Dhavani Kanavugal (1984).

Critical reception
Behindwoods wrote "Director Sundareswaran subjects you to a melodramatic version of struggling-youngsters-making-it-big combined with a friend’s-sacrifice story. He also stages the hate-me-since-I-will-die-in-a-few-days sacrificial love story intertwined in a plot already ridden with too many clichés." Balaji B of Thiraipadam wrote "Thozhaa has a strong central protagonist but surrounds him with characters who are not so strong. So the film is on strong ground when focusing on its protagonist but turns slow and dragging when dealing with the people surrounding him. This happens throughout the film, from the initial backstories the characters are given to the final climax. So on the whole, Thozhaa is a not-so-bad film about a good friend." Rediff wrote "Imagine a sturdy house, brightly coloured, reasonably proportioned standing on wilting, slender sticks that barely support it amidst swirling flood-waters. That's Arowana Films' Thozha, directed by N Sundareshwaran."

References

2008 films
Indian romantic musical films
2000s Tamil-language films
Films scored by Premgi Amaren